The Humidity Sounder for Brazil (HSB) was an instrument launched on NASA's Earth Observing System satellite Aqua launched in May 2002.  It was a four-channel passive microwave radiometer, with one channel at 150 GHz and three channels at 183 GHz.  It was very similar in design to the AMSU-B instrument, except it lacked the 89 GHz surface sounding channel.  It was intended to study profiles of atmospheric water vapor and provide improved input data to the cloud-clearing algorithms in the Unified AIRS Retrieval Suite, but the scan mirror motor failed on February 5, 2003.  It worked with the Atmospheric Infrared Sounder and AMSU-A to form the AIRS Sounding Suite.

HSB was manufactured by Matra Marconi Space, Limited (MMS), in the United Kingdom under a contract with the Brazilian National Institute for Space Research (INPE).

Instrument characteristics 

Heritage: AMSU-B
Swath: 1650 km
Spatial resolution: 13.5 km horizontal at nadir
Mass: 51 kg
Duty cycle: 100%
Power: 56 W
Data rate: 4.2 kbit/s
Field of View: ± 49.5 degrees cross-track
Instrument Instantaneous Field of View: 1.1 degrees circular

Table 1: Radiometric characteristics of the HSB

History 
HSB stopped scanning suddenly and without warning over the Pacific Ocean February 5, 2003 at 21:39 UTC.  The most likely cause is an electrical failure in the scan electronics.  By design AMSU-B and therefore HSB had very limited hardware redundancy and software update capability.

External links
HSB instrument guide
HSB data at NASA Goddard

Atmospheric sounding satellite sensors
Space program of Brazil